Jeroen Sluijter (born April 2, 1975 in Zwijndrecht) is a Dutch baseball player who currently plays for Neptunus and the Dutch national team.

Sluijter debuted in the Hoofdklasse in 1993 with the Twins Sport Club. In 1996, he moved to SV ADO and then Neptunus in 1997. With Neptunus, he became Hoofdklasse champion each year from 1998–2005, one of the greatest dynasties in Netherlands baseball history. He went 2 for 5 in the 1997 World Port Tournament, his lone Dutch national team appearance of the 20th Century.

Sluijter returned to the national team in 2002, appearing in the Haarlem Baseball Week. He went 1 for 4 as a backup infielder; in the gold medal game, he was a late substitute for Evert-Jan 't Hoen and did not bat in a 5-4 loss to the United States. In the 2002 Intercontinental Cup, he was 1 for 3, backing up former AAA player 't Hoen at second and former major leaguer Ralph Milliard at shortstop. Sluijter played for the Dutch in three events in 2003. In the 2003 World Port Tournament, he was a starter and hit .292/.452/.292 and led the event with 7 walks. He led the Netherlands with 2 hits (in 3 tries) in a 3-2 loss to Cuba in the gold medal game, though he did make one error at third base. He was 0 for 2 with 2 walks and a run in the 2003 European Championship and did not play in the gold medal game, which the Netherlands won. In the 2003 Baseball World Cup, he only played one inning in the field as the backup 2B to 't Hoen and went 0 for 1 at the plate.

In the 2004 Hoofdklasse season, Sluijter tied for 6th with 9 doubles. He was 0 for 3 in the 2004 Haarlem Baseball Week and did not play in the gold medal game, which the Orange won against Cuba. It was his last time on the national team for four years. In 2005, Sluijter tied for 8th in the Hoofdklasse with 26 runs, albeit only tied for 5th on Neptunus. He hit only .213/.323/.272 that year and fielded .940 at the hot corner. The next year, he had his best season yet, batting .324/.380/.394. He tied Sidney de Jong and Reily Legito for 7th in the loop with 10 doubles and was 12th in average. His .947 fielding percentage led the Hoofdklasse third baseman. 2007 was a down year as he hit .220/.348/.295 and fielded .899 at third.

In the 2008 European Cup in Regensburg, Sluijter hit .444/.500/.833 with 7 runs and 7 RBI in 5 games. Against the Templiers de Sénart, he was 3 for 3 with 2 homers and a walk to lead the Neptunus charge. He was 8th in the Cup in average, tied Legito and Giuseppe Mazzanti for second in RBI (one behind Eugene Kingsale) and tied four others (including Luis Ugueto and Pavel Budsky) for the home run lead (2). He tied for 4th in runs, two behind leader Simon Kudernatsch. He went 1 for 2 with a walk and a run in the 2008 Haarlem Baseball Week, his first appearance with the national team in four years. Thanks in part to an injury to Hainley Statia, Sluijter remained with the Orange for the 2008 Summer Olympics in Beijing.

External links
Sluijter's profile at honkbalsite.com

References

1975 births
Living people
Dutch baseball players
Olympic baseball players of the Netherlands
Baseball players at the 2008 Summer Olympics
Sportspeople from Zwijndrecht, Netherlands
DOOR Neptunus players